Warr Acres (formerly known as VMusic) is a contemporary worship music band from Warr Acres, Oklahoma. They are on the DREAM Records label, which they released their first studio album on August 23, 2011 entitled Warr Acres, and their second studio LP called Hope Will Rise on October 29, 2013.

Background
Warr Acres formerly called VMusic are from Warr Acres, Oklahoma, and their home church is Victory Church in Oklahoma City.

Music
In 2011, the band were signed to DREAM Records, which is an independent Christian music label in the United States.

Independent albums
As VMusic, they released six independent albums starting with 2005's Unfold, 2006's Resonation, 2007's Displegar and Wait, 2009's Altísima Adoración and Fixed On You.

Studio albums
The band released their eponymously titled first studio album Warr Acres on August 23, 2011. It saw success on the Billboard 200 and Christian Albums charts at numbers 166 and 8, respectively. In addition, it placed at number 19 on the Independent Albums chart.

Their second album, Hope Will Rise did better on the charts: Released on October 29, 2013, Hope Will Rise peaked at number 118 on the Billboard 200 and number 6 on the Christian Albums chart.

Members
Current members
 Aubrey Huffman – vocals
 Lael Ewing (née Louthan) – vocals 
 Chris Crow – keys and vocals
 Oscar Ortiz - vocals
 Jaron Nix – electric guitar

Former members
 Matt Payne – bass guitar and vocals
 Kristy Starling – vocals

Discography

Studio albums

References

External links
 

Musical groups established in 2005
Musical groups from Oklahoma
2005 establishments in Oklahoma